Mechanicsville is an unincorporated community in New Castle County, Delaware, United States.

The community is located in "The Wedge", a geometric oddity arising out of ambiguity in the 18th-century border dispute settlement between the Penns and Calverts in the British North American colonies.  Until 1921, Mechanicsville was claimed by both Pennsylvania and Delaware.  A resolution allocated Mechanicsville and The Wedge to Delaware, which owns it today.

References 

Borders of Delaware
Pre-statehood history of Pennsylvania
Internal territorial disputes of the United States
Border irregularities of the United States
Borders of Pennsylvania
Unincorporated communities in New Castle County, Delaware
Border tripoints
Unincorporated communities in Delaware